Črešnjevec pri Oštrcu is a settlement in the Gorjanci Hills in the Municipality of Kostanjevica na Krki in eastern Slovenia. Its territory extends right to the border with Croatia. The area is part of the traditional region of Lower Carniola. It is now included in the Lower Sava Statistical Region.

Name
The name of the settlement was changed from Črešnjevec to Črešnjevec pri Oštrcu in 1953. In the past the German name was Kerschdorf.

References

External links
Črešnjevec pri Oštrcu on Geopedia

Populated places in the Municipality of Kostanjevica na Krki